The 1978 Maryland Terrapins football team represented the University of Maryland in the 1978 NCAA Division I-A football season. In their seventh season under head coach Jerry Claiborne, the Terrapins compiled a 9–3 record (5–1 in conference), finished in second place in the Atlantic Coast Conference, and outscored their opponents 261 to 167. The team ended its season with a 42–0 loss to Texas in the 1978 Sun Bowl. The team's statistical leaders included Tim O'Hare with 1,388 passing yards, Steve Atkins with 1,261 rushing yards, and Dean Richards with 575 receiving yards.

Schedule

References

Maryland
Maryland Terrapins football seasons
Maryland Terrapins football